The UBC Thunderbirds are the athletic teams that represent the University of British Columbia in the University Endowment Lands just outside the city limits of Vancouver, British Columbia, Canada. In Canadian intercollegiate competition, the Thunderbirds are the most successful athletic program both regionally in the Canada West Universities Athletic Association, and nationally in U Sports.

Teams
Across 14 varsity sport disciplines, UBC fields 25 teams overall; notably, 13 of which compete in U Sports, and eight in the American collegiate NAIA circuit:
 Baseball (m)
 Basketball (m/w)
 Cross Country Running (m/w)
 Field Hockey (m/w)
 Football (m)
 Golf (m/w)
 Ice Hockey (m/w)
 Rowing (m/w)
 Rugby (m/w)
 Soccer (m/w)
 Softball (w)
 Swimming (m/w)
 Track & Field (m/w)
 Volleyball (m/w)

Football

The UBC Thunderbirds football team has won the CWUAA Hardy Trophy conference championship 16 times, which is third all-time among competing teams. On a national level, the team has won the Vanier Cup championship four times, in 1982, 1986, 1997 and, most recently, in 2015. The team has also lost twice in the title game, in 1978 and 1987. The Thunderbirds program has also yielded three Hec Crighton Trophy winners: Jordan Gagner in 1987; Mark Nohra in 1997; and, most recently, Billy Greene in 2011.

Baseball
In the summer of 1996, 30 years after the original UBC baseball program was disbanded due to budget cuts, Athletic Director Bob Phillip along with former professional Jim Murphy and community baseball coach Mark Hiscott provided funding for the present day Thunderbirds baseball. Hiscott recognized student Terry McKaig, a former collegiate player and national team member, as the one to take over the program as head coach. Since 1997, McKaig has been the driving force behind the T-Birds with support and funding from such major leaguers as Jeff Zimmerman and Ryan Dempster. In 2015, Chris Pritchett was named the new head coach of the baseball team and Terry moved up to the position of Director of Baseball.

The Thunderbirds compete in the United States as the only Canadian member of the National Association of Intercollegiate Athletics (NAIA). In 2001, the program reached a new level as the New York Mets made Derran Watts the first ever Thunderbird to be drafted, when they selected him in the 12th round. Since then nine more Thunderbirds have been drafted including 2007 World Series starter Jeff Francis. T-bird baseball successes include their trip to the 2006 NAIA World Series.

Women's basketball

Men's ice hockey
Father David Bauer coached the Thunderbirds for two seasons, and led the team to a Western Canadian Intercollegiate Athletic Association championship in 1963, and reached the final game of the Canadian Interuniversity Athletic Union men's ice hockey championship tournament for the CIAU University Cup, but lost by a 3–2 score to the McMaster Marauders.

Bob Hindmarch began coaching the men's ice hockey team during the 1964–65 season, and led them to the 1971 Western Canadian Intercollegiate Athletic Association championship. He accumulated a winning record in 11 of 12 seasons, and set UBC record with 214 wins by a coach in ice hockey. In December 1973, they became one of the first Western Bloc sports teams to tour China, and played a series of games focused on friendship and teaching hockey skills to local players. The trip was supported by the Government of Canada as part of a desire to normalize relations with China, and was not well-publicized at the time. The Thunderbirds won all seven games played by a combined scored of 56 to 5.

Women's ice hockey

Men's rugby
Men's rugby is one of the oldest varsity sports at UBC (including the precursor to UBC, McGill University College of BC, varsity rugby started in 1906).  The varsity XV now competes against the University of Victoria in a two-game, combined score series to claim the coveted "Boot". They also play a two-game, combined score series against the University of California  for the "World Cup" trophy (a competition started in 1921). The varsity XV was coached for many years by Spence McTavish (former UBC varsity rugby captain, former Canadian rugby international and captain, and former Bobby Gaul award winner), and assistant coach Rod Holloway (former UBC varsity rugby scrumhalf, and former assistant coach of Canada's National Senior Men's team (RWC 1995).

The men's team is currently coached by Curry Hitchborn.

UBC's rugby program has a long tradition of producing national team rugby players (7s and 15s), most recently Jim Douglas (RWC 2003), Mike Burak (RWC 2007), Chris Pack, Ryan MacWhinney, Justin Mensah-Coker, Tyler Hotson, Eric Wilson, Harry Jones (RWC 2015), Brock Staller and Ben LeSage.

Men's soccer
The UBC Thunderbirds are the most successful men's soccer program in Canada, having won 13 U Sports championships, eight more than any other school in the country. They have also won 22 Canada West conference titles since competition started in 1972.

Notable players include Brian Budd, Pat Onstad, and Srdjan Djekanovic.

In the 1960s and 1970s, the Thunderbirds played in the old Pacific Coast League, notably finishing as league runners up in 1967-68 and 1968-69.

Men's volleyball
The Thunderbirds men's volleyball team has won four U Sports men's volleyball championships and five conference championships. Kerry MacDonald took over the helm of the men's volleyball program starting with the 2016–17 season. In the following season, the Thunderbirds defeated the two-time defending champion Trinity Western Spartans in straight sets in the U Sports gold medal match on March 18, 2018 to win their first national title since 1983. MacDonald resigned after this season to take a position with Volley Canada and Mike Hawkins took over as head coach for the 2018–19 season.

Women's volleyball
The Thunderbirds women's volleyball team has been the most successful program in its sport, with 12 National Championship victories, most recently in 2019. The Thunderbirds have also won 16 conference titles with the most recent win occurring in 2014. The team has been led by head coach Doug Reimer since 2000 (and from 1994 to 1997) and he has accounted for eight of the program's championship wins. Notably, in the 2013 gold medal match, the Thunderbirds defeated the Alberta Pandas in straight sets to tie U Sports' all-time record—shared with the Winnipeg Wesmen (1983-1988) and Alberta Pandas (1995-2000) for holding the longest reign as a repeat champion in the sport with six consecutive wins (2008-2013). The program has also featured five Mary Lyons Award winners, with Liz Cordonier (2010), Shanice Marcelle (2011, 2013), Kyla Richey (2012), Lisa Barclay (2014), and Kiera Van Ryk (2019) each winning the award.

U Sports and NAIA National Championships

U Sports Championships
Women's Swimming (24)
2020, 2019, 2018, 2017, 2015, 2014, 2013, 2012, 2008, 2007, 2006, 2005, 2004, 2003, 2002, 2001, 2000, 1999, 1998, 1996, 1995, 1994, 1986, 1985

Men's Swimming (20)
2023, 2022, 2020, 2019, 2018, 2017, 2015, 2012, 2009, 2007, 2006, 2005, 2004, 2003, 2002, 2001, 2000, 1999, 1998, 1965

Women's Field Hockey (19)
2017, 2016, 2015, 2014, 2013, 2012, 2011, 2009, 2006, 2004, 2003, 2001, 1999, 1998, 1990, 1983, 1982, 1980, 1978

Men's Soccer (13)
2013, 2012, 2007, 2005, 1994, 1992, 1991, 1990, 1989, 1986, 1985, 1984, 1974

Women's Volleyball (12)
2019, 2017, 2013, 2012, 2011, 2010, 2009, 2008, 1978, 1977, 1974, 1973

Women's Basketball (6)
2008, 2006, 2004, 1974, 1973, 1972

Women's Soccer (7)
2019, 2015, 2006, 2003, 2002, 1993, 1987

Football (4)
2015, 1997, 1986, 1982

Men's Volleyball (4)
2018, 1983, 1976, 1967

Men's Basketball (2)
1972, 1970

National Association of Intercollegiate Athletics Championships (13)
Women's golf
2022, 2019, 2012, 2010, 2004, 2000

Men's golf
2008

Women's cross country
2013, 2012

Men's cross country
2017

Women's track and field
2019

Men's track and field
2019, 2017

Facilities

 Doug Mitchell Thunderbird Sports Centre (Ice Hockey)
 John M.S. Lecky UBC Boathouse (Rowing)
 Thunderbird Stadium (Football and Soccer)
 Thunderbird Park (Field Hockey, Rugby, Soccer, Track & Field)
 War Memorial Gymnasium (Basketball and Volleyball)
 UBC Aquatics Centre (Swimming)
 Gerald McGavin UBC Rugby Centre (Rugby)
 UBC Baseball Rose Indoor Training Centre (Baseball)

Fight song
UBC used to have a fight song "Hail UBC", written by Harold King in 1931. 
A pep song with the same name "Hail UBC", written by Steve Chatman, was adopted in 2011. The lyrics go:

Hail to the Thunderbirds! Hail UBC! 
Thunder and lightning — Onward to victory! 
Hail to the Blue-and-Gold! Hail UBC! 
U, B, C forever — Onward to victory!

NCAA membership bid
In 2005, they applied to become members of the principal U.S. college sports governing body, the NCAA. They are not the first Canadian school to try to join the NCAA; in 2000, local rival Simon Fraser, then exclusively an NAIA member, sought to join the NCAA but was turned down. At the time, the NCAA's constitution prohibited non-U.S. schools from joining; however, some observers believed the real reason Simon Fraser was turned down was that the school sought to join as a Division II school, and the NCAA did not want to set a precedent with a lower-level school. UBC, on the other hand, was reportedly interested in joining Division I. UBC's athletic budget of approximately $4 million Canadian is dwarfed by those of schools in the Pacific-12 Conference, the only BCS conference on the U.S. West Coast. However, at least two mid-major conferences with a West Coast presence, the West Coast Conference and Western Athletic Conference, had been suggested as possible future homes for the Thunderbirds.

The NCAA approved a change to its constitution on January 14, 2008 to allow Canadian schools to become members. Under a 10-year pilot program due to begin June 1, 2008, Canadian schools can join the NCAA as Division II members, and any school that meets the June 1 deadline for application can become a member as of the academic year immediately following the deadline. CIS has not officially indicated whether a school joining the NCAA under this program can retain its CIS membership. It was expected that both UBC and Simon Fraser would be among the first schools to apply for NCAA membership under this program. Simon Fraser did apply and was accepted, but in April 2009 UBC deferred a decision on applying.

Awards and honors
Since 1984, the Outstanding Female Athlete of the Year Award is named in honor of Marilyn Pomfret. Before her death in April 2019, she had spent 23 years at UBC, supporting the increase in funding and intramurals for women.  Having worked as a coach, Pomfret also served as the Director of Women's Athletics from 1963 to 1969, followed by a second stint from 1972 to 1986. In addition, she served in the role of president of the Women's Athletic Directorate, creating and organizing several women's sporting events. Prior to her administrative career, Pomfret was a student-athlete, arriving to UBC in 1951, participating in basketball and volleyball.

Athletes of the Year
This is an incomplete list

The Thunderbirds Female Athlete of the Year is awarded the Marilyn Pomfret Trophy. In recognition of the Male Athlete of the Year, the Bus Phillips Memorial Trophy is awarded. 

Du Vivier Team of the Year
 2013: UBC Thunderbirds women's ice hockey
 2015: (tie) Women's cross country, Men's swimming
 2016: UBC Thunderbirds football
 2017: Men's Rugby
 2019: Women's Volleyball
 2020: Women's Golf

Canada West Hall of Fame
UBC Thunderettes Women's Basketball Team (1969-75) - 2021 Inductee: Canada West Hall of Fame 
Joanne Sargent - 2019 inductee: Canada West Hall of Fame

Sport BC Honors
Danielle Brisebois, Volleyball: 2018 Sport BC University Athlete of the Year
Deb Huband Coach, Basketball: 2018 Sport BC In Her Footsteps Honouree

Further reading

Notes and references

External links